Reuf Duraković (born 21 March 1994) is a footballer who plays as a goalkeeper for FC Nenzing. Born in Austria, he represented Bosnia and Herzegovina at under-19 international level.

Duraković's family moved  from Bužim to Lustenau before he was born.

References

1994 births
Living people
People from Feldkirch, Vorarlberg
Austrian people of Bosnia and Herzegovina descent
Austrian footballers
Bosnia and Herzegovina footballers
Footballers from Vorarlberg
Association football goalkeepers
Bosnia and Herzegovina youth international footballers
FC Lustenau players
S.S.D. Varese Calcio players
SV Ried players
SC Rheindorf Altach players
Austrian Football Bundesliga players
2. Liga (Austria) players
Austrian Regionalliga players
Bosnia and Herzegovina expatriate footballers
Austrian expatriate footballers
Austrian expatriate sportspeople in Italy
Expatriate footballers in Italy
Bosnia and Herzegovina expatriate sportspeople in Italy